Krasnokamianka (all meaning "Red Stone Place"), also known as Kiziltash or Kyzyltash, is a village located in the Feodosiya municipality of the Autonomous Republic of Crimea, a territory recognized by a majority of countries as part of Ukraine and occupied by Russia as the Republic of Crimea. Population: 

Mountain slopes of the Kyzyltash tract are forested with downy oak, sessile oak, and common hornbeam. Common relict plants listed in the Red Book of Ukraine are often found: Greek juniper, pistacia atlantica, many species of orchids.

The highest peak in the vicinity, Sandyk-Kaya ("Stone forehead") stands 698 meters above sea level.

In late 1950, the Council of Ministers of USSR adopted a decision on the establishment of a central database storage of nuclear weapons - TSBH, i.e. organizations that carry out the assembly and storage of produced in the factories of the Ministry of Medium Machine Building of USSR (USSR Minsredmash, MSM USSR) nuclear weapons.

The first central database storage (object "C ") were in the south of the Crimean military unit (B / W) № 62047 (Krasnokamyanka, Simferopol-10 or Theodosius-13) "Object 712" - Commander of the M. Nemirovsky.  

In post-Soviet Ukraine the 47th regiment of special purpose Crimean territorial command of Interior Troops of Ukraine "Tiger" (a / h 4125), based in Krasnokamenka.

References 

Feodosia Municipality
Villages in Crimea
Former closed cities